Vachellia zapatensis is a species of plant in the family Fabaceae endemic to the Zapata Peninsula, Cuba.

References

zapatensis
Flora of Cuba
Endangered plants
Taxonomy articles created by Polbot